East Dunbartonshire is one of the 32 council areas of Scotland. It borders the north of Glasgow and contains many of the affluent areas to the north of the city, including Bearsden, Milngavie, Milton of Campsie, Balmore and Torrance,  as well as many of the city's commuter towns and villages. East Dunbartonshire also shares borders with North Lanarkshire, Stirling and West Dunbartonshire. The council area covers parts of the historic counties of Dunbartonshire, Lanarkshire and Stirlingshire.

The council area was formed in 1996, as a result of the Local Government etc. (Scotland) Act 1994, from the former Bearsden and Milngavie district and most of the former Strathkelvin district, which had been part of Strathclyde region.

History
East Dunbartonshire was created in 1996 under the Local Government etc. (Scotland) Act 1994, which abolished the regions and districts which had been created in 1975, replacing them with unitary council areas. East Dunbartonshire covered the area of the abolished Bearsden and Milngavie and Strathkelvin districts (except the Chryston and Auchinloch area from the latter, which went to North Lanarkshire). Both former districts had been in the Strathclyde region.

Both of East Dunbartonshire's predecessor districts had been created in 1975 under the Local Government (Scotland) Act 1973. The Bearsden and Milngavie district had been created covering Milngavie, Bearsden and adjoining areas from Dunbartonshire. The Strathkelvin district had been created covering Kirkintilloch and adjoining areas from Dunbartonshire, Bishopbriggs and adjoining areas from Lanarkshire, and the parishes of Baldernock and Campsie from Stirlingshire.

Demographics
East Dunbartonshire council area has low levels of deprivation, with relatively low unemployment and low levels of crime. The population is both declining and ageing.

In a 2007 Reader's Digest poll, East Dunbartonshire was voted the best place in Britain to raise a family. The area has generally performed well in the Halifax  Quality of Life survey; in 2010 it was ranked third in Scotland, and it was the only Scottish area in the British Top 20 in 2008. A Legatum Prosperity Index published by the Legatum Institute in October 2016 showed East Dunbartonshire as the most prosperous council area in Scotland and the ninth most prosperous in the United Kingdom.

Communities
The area is divided into thirteen community council areas, twelve of which have community councils as at 2023 (being those with asterisks in the list below):

Baldernock*
Bearsden East*
Bearsden North*
Bearsden West*
Bishopbriggs*
Campsie*
Kirkintilloch*
Lenzie*
Milngavie*
Milton of Campsie*
Torrance*
Twechar
Waterside*

Governance

Political control
The first election to East Dunbartonshire Council was held in 1995, initially operating as a shadow authority alongside the outgoing authorities until the new system came into force on 1 April 1996. Political control of the council since 1996 has been as follows:

Leadership
The first leader of the council, Charles Kennedy, had been the last leader of the old Strathkelvin District Council. The leaders of East Dunbartonshire Council since 1996 have been:

Premises
Since 2012 the council has been based at 12 Strathkelvin Place in Kirkintilloch, which forms part of the Southbank Marina development adjoining the Forth and Clyde Canal. Prior to 2012 the council was based at Tom Johnston House at the junction of Lenzie Road and Civic Way in Kirkintilloch. Tom Johnston House had been built in 1985 as the headquarters for the old Strathkelvin District Council and was named after Tom Johnston (1881–1965), who was born in Kirkintilloch and had served as Secretary of State for Scotland during the Second World War. Tom Johnston House was demolished in 2015. The new council chamber at Strathkelvin Place is called Tom Johnston Chamber.

Elections
Since 2007 elections have been held every five years under the single transferable vote system, introduced by the Local Governance (Scotland) Act 2004. Election results since 1995 have been as follows:

Wards

Since 2007, the council (as with all others in Scotland) has been elected using multi-member wards, each returning three councillors using a single transferable vote system of proportional representation. Initially this retained the number of councillors at 24 following on from the same number of single-member wards in previous elections, divided equally across eight wards. However, a national boundary and population review prior to the 2017 Scottish local elections led to the number of East Dunbartonshire wards being reduced to seven and the number of councillors being reduced to 22. These current wards are:

Towns and villages
 Auchenhowie
 Auchinairn
 Auchinreoch
 Baldernock
 Balmore
 Bardowie
 Bearsden
 Birdston
 Bishopbriggs
 Cadder
 Clachan of Campsie
 Kirkintilloch
 Lennoxtown
 Lenzie
 Woodilee Village
 Milngavie
 Milton of Campsie
 Torrance
 Twechar
 Waterside

Places of interest
 Campsie Fells
 West Highland Way
 Forth and Clyde Canal
 Antonine Wall
 Mugdock Country Park
 Milngavie water treatment works
 River Kelvin
 Lillie Art Gallery
 Auld Kirk Museum
 Huntershill Village
 The Fort Theatre
 The Turret Theatre
 The Gadloch

Education
There are 8 secondary schools and 33 primary schools in the area. The secondary schools are:
Bearsden Academy, Bearsden
Bishopbriggs Academy, Bishopbriggs
Boclair Academy, Bearsden
Douglas Academy, Milngavie
Kirkintilloch High School, Kirkintilloch
Lenzie Academy, Lenzie
St Ninian's High School, Kirkintilloch
Turnbull High School, Bishopbriggs

References

External links

 
 East Dunbartonshire Council report prepared for the Scottish Government Accounts Commission
 Huntershill Village website

 
Council areas of Scotland